Erik Storz (born June 24, 1975) is a former American football linebacker. He played for the Jacksonville Jaguars from 1998 to 2000.

References

1975 births
Living people
American football linebackers
Boston College Eagles football players
Jacksonville Jaguars players
People from Rockaway, New Jersey
Players of American football from New Jersey
Sportspeople from Morris County, New Jersey